The 1994 reenactments of the Lincoln–Douglas Debates took place between August 20 and October 15, 1994, and were facilitated and aired by C-SPAN. They featured historical reenactors presenting, in their entireties, the series of seven debates between Abraham Lincoln and Stephen A. Douglas that took place during the 1858 U.S. Senate campaign in Illinois. The debate reenactments were held in the same seven cities as were the 1858 debates, and were performed on dates very close to the anniversaries of the original debates. They were broadcast live on C-SPAN, and have been rebroadcast periodically ever since.

Background
The inspiration for the series came from the book The Lincoln–Douglas Debates: The First Complete, Unexpurgated Text, edited by Harold Holzer. Holzer had been interviewed about that book the previous year on the C-SPAN series Booknotes.

In 1993, C-SPAN staff approached the mayors of the seven cities in Illinois where the 1858 debates had been held (Ottawa, Freeport, Jonesboro, Charleston, Galesburg, Quincy, and Alton) and arranged with each city to recreate the debates using their own local resources. Subsequently, C-SPAN spent over $300,000 on the promotion and coverage of the debates and on the creation of related educational materials.

The C-SPAN School Bus was used as a traveling television studio at each of the debate locations. Prof. John Splaine of the University of Maryland, College Park, was a consultant to C-SPAN and provided commentary on each of the debates.

Debates

References

External links
Lincoln-Douglas Debates programs from 1994
Photographs of Michael Krebs's portrayal of Lincoln at Galesburg
Examples of commemorative artwork by William L. Brown
Booknotes interview with Holzer on The Lincoln-Douglas Debates, August 22, 1993.

Cultural depictions of Abraham Lincoln
C-SPAN original programming
Reenactment of the late modern period
1994 in American television
1994 in Illinois
Political debates
1990s American television series
1994 television specials
American television talk shows
August 1994 events in the United States
September 1994 events in the United States
October 1994 events in the United States